Charles John Ridgeway (14 July 184128 February 1927) was an English churhman, the Bishop of Chichester from 1908 to 1919.

Life
Ridgeway was born into an ecclesiastical family: his father Joseph Ridgeway was Vicar of Christ Church, Tunbridge Wells; his younger brother of Frederick became Bishop of Salisbury. He was educated at St Paul's School, and matriculated in 1860 at Trinity College, Cambridge, graduating B.A. in 1864, M.A. 1885 and D.D. 1906.

Ordained in 1866, Ridgeway spent a curacy at Christ Church, Tunbridge Wells before becoming Vicar of North Malvern, Rector of Buckhurst Hill, Vicar of Christchurch Lancaster Gate and Rural Dean of Paddington. From 1891-1894 he was a member of the London School Board, representing the Marylebone Division.

A Freemason, Ridgeway was under the jurisdiction of the United Grand Lodge of England. In 1897 he was granted the honorific rank of Past Grand Chaplain in recognition of his services to English Freemasonry, as part of a series of similar honorary promotions intended to mark the diamond jubilee of Queen Victoria.

After two years (1906–1908) as Dean of Carlisle Ridgeway was appointed Bishop of Chichester in 1908. His appointment was at the age of 66, and the result of a dispute between the Archbishop of Canterbury and the Prime Minister, who was then the key figure in the nomination process for bishops. There was disagreement over rival candidates, and Ridgeway appears to have been a compromise.

During World War I, Ridgeway provided support for soldiers in the large military camps in Sussex, and encouraged the recruitment of temporary chaplains.

Ridgeway died on 28 February 1927 aged 85 in London, and was buried at Limpsfield. An obituary noted that he had " ... too much sense of humour ever to take himself heavily, and was too much a man of the world ever to lose his realism."

Legacy

After his death Ridgeway's widow presented his pectoral cross to the Chichester Cathedral library, and commissioned a memorial to him which can be seen in the nave.

Family
Ridgeway was twice married:

In 1866, to Susan Jane Fitzgerald, daughter of the Rev. Gerald Fitzgerald; their daughter Una Geraldine married in 1892 Ronald Montagu Burrows.
In 1899, to Katherine Margaret Johnston, daughter of the Rev. Hugh William Johnston.

Notes

External links 
 
 Remembering the Laying of Bognor Church Foundation Stone on 22 July 1910

1841 births
1927 deaths
People educated at St Paul's School, London
Alumni of Trinity College, Cambridge
Deans of Carlisle
Bishops of Chichester
20th-century Church of England bishops
Members of the London School Board